Motion Sickness: Live Recordings is a live album by Bright Eyes. Documenting the I'm Wide Awake, It's Morning tours from the first half of 2005, Motion Sickness is a compilation of live tracks, including covers of Feist and Elliott Smith. It comes with a 24-page booklet featuring an extensive tour diary written by Jason Boesel (Bright Eyes live band/Rilo Kiley).

This album is the 6th release of Team Love Records.

Track listing
All songs written by Conor Oberst unless otherwise noted.
"At the Bottom of Everything" – 3:44
"We Are Nowhere and It’s Now" – 4:01
"Old Soul Song (For the New World Order)" – 4:07
"Make War (Short Version)" – 0:43
"Make War" – 5:41
"A Scale, a Mirror and Those Indifferent Clocks" – 2:22
"Landlocked Blues" – 5:51
"Method Acting" – 3:41
"Train Under Water" – 5:59
"When the President Talks to God" – 3:27
"Road to Joy" – 5:56
"Mushaboom" (Leslie Feist) – 2:44
"True Blue" – 5:41
"Southern State" – 4:40
"The Biggest Lie" (Elliott Smith) – 2:48

Personnel
Stefanie Drootin – bass
Nate Walcott – trumpet, Wurlitzer, organ
Mike Mogis – mandolin, pedal steel, electric guitar, resophonic guitar, tambourine
Alex McManus – guitar, back-up singer
Conor Oberst – lead singer, guitar, wurlitzer, organ
Jason Boesel – drums
Nick White – Wurlitzer, organ
Jesse Harris - guitar (track 15)
Jacob Feinberg - Recording and Mix engineer

References

Bright Eyes (band) live albums
2005 live albums
Team Love Records live albums